Cotton School was a school of the Independent School District 2142 in Northern Minnesota. It was located in Cotton, Minnesota. The school opened in 1922, and closed in June 2011.

Building
The building opened in 1922. Several expansions have been put on. The school contained 2 gyms, a cafeteria, many classrooms, a music room, a large library and a newly constructed playground.

Closing
In an ISD 2142 referendum in December 2009, voters approved the closing of Cotton due to low attendance. The school closed down before the 2011–2012 school year. It was purchased by a non-profit community group that has converted the building to a local community and arts center.

Principals
Sidney Simonson (2000–2006)
John Metsa (2006–2008)
Jeff Carey (2008–2010)
Kirsti Berlin (2010–2011)

References

Defunct schools in Minnesota
Schools in St. Louis County, Minnesota
Educational institutions established in 1922
Educational institutions disestablished in 2011
1922 establishments in Minnesota
2011 disestablishments in Minnesota